General elections were held in Tonga on 17 March 2005. Only nine members of the 30-seat parliament were elected, the rest appointed by the King or were members of the Tongan aristocracy. The Human Rights and Democracy Movement won seven of the nine seats. 'Aho'eitu 'Unuaki'otonga Tuku'aho, son of the King, initially retained his position as Prime Minister, but he resigned in 2006, with the position passing to Feleti Sevele, one of the two independent candidates elected. Sevele is the first non-noble Prime Minister of the country.

Results

By constituency

Aftermath
By-election were held on 5 May 2005 to fill vacancies in Tongatapu and Niuas following the appointment of Feleti Sevele and Sione Haukinima to the cabinet.  Former Police Minister Clive Edwards was elected in Tongatapu, and Lepolo Taunisila was elected in Niuas.
  
A third by-election was held on 20 July 2006 for the Ha'apai electorate after Fineasi Funaki was appointed as Minister of Tourism.  The election was won by 'Osai Laatu.

References

Elections in Tonga
Tonga
General
Tonga